Juan de Guillebon, better known by his stage name DyE, is a French musician. He is most known for the music video for the single "Fantasy" from his first album Taki 183.

Debut album and success
Tigersushi:

Taki 183 was recorded using analogue equipment such as a Roland TR-606, Moog Source and a Korg Poly Six into Pro-Tools.

"Fantasy" was released together with an animated body horror themed music video to promote the single. This video became popular, attracting over 65 million views, 49 million of those within two years.

Discography

Albums
Taki 183 (2011)
Cocktail Citron (2014)
Inside Out (2018)

EPs
Imperator (2009)
Emo Machine (2017)

References

External links
DyE at Myspace

French musicians
Living people
Year of birth missing (living people)